Anthony Leone (born July 18, 1969) is an American musician. He is best known for his membership in the bands Ollabelle and the Chris Robinson Brotherhood. He has also worked with a variety of musicians including Levon Helm of The Band and Phil Lesh of the Grateful Dead. In September 2020 he was announced as a new member of Little Feat.

Life and career 
Leone was born on July 18, 1969, in New Britain, Connecticut. He grew up in Newington, Connecticut and began performing in bands at the age of 11, initially covering artists such as Jimi Hendrix and Led Zeppelin. During his adolescence he developed an interest in jazz through musicians such as Miles Davis, John Coltrane and Wayne Shorter. He studied music at the University of Hartford under jazz saxophonist Jackie McLean. It was during this time that Leone decided to pursue drums as his primary musical instrument. During his time at Hartt, Jackie McLean introduced him to Jazz Drumming great Art Taylor. Leone then took private lessons with Taylor on a few different occasions.

Following the completion of his studies, Leone spent a year living in New York City where he played small jazz clubs for a living. He was given the offer to travel to Berlin Germany to play drums with a theater review. He moved back to Hartford in 1994 and performed in bands led by trombonist Steve Davis. It was during this time that he began going up to Lexington, MA weekly for lessons with the great drum teacher, Alan Dawson. He studied with Dawson over the course of about nine months.  He moved back to New York City in 1998 and performed for the next four years with a variety of musicians. He also began teaching at Hartt as an adjunct professor of drum set studies during this time.

In 2002 he co-founded American roots band Ollabelle with Amy Helm, daughter of Levon Helm. Shortly after forming Ollabelle, Leone began performing sporadically with the Levon Helm Band. He would play drums at some concerts when Helm went to the front of the stage to play mandolin.

In January 2015 he joined the Chris Robinson Brotherhood a blues rock band led by former Black Crowes singer Chris Robinson, replacing their original drummer George Sluppick. He also performs sporadically with different lineups of Phil Lesh and Friends, a band led by bassist Phil Lesh of the Grateful Dead.

Other artists that Leone has recorded and performed with include Anders Osborne, Shooter Jennings, Rickie Lee Jones, Donald Fagen, Phoebe Snow, Garth Hudson, David Bromberg, Keb' Mo', Chip Taylor, Jim White, Marshall Crenshaw, Jimmy Vivino, Steve Earle, Allison Moorer, Bruce Springsteen and The Allman Brothers Band.

References

External links 
Official website

1969 births
Living people
Chris Robinson Brotherhood members
20th-century American drummers
American male drummers
20th-century American male musicians
Ollabelle members